Sir Kenneth James Priestley Barraclough, CBE, TD, JP (22 March 1907 – 3 April 2001) was a British barrister and magistrate who was Chief Metropolitan Stipendiary Magistrate between 1975 and 1978.

He was also a colonel in the Inns of Court Regiment.

References 

 https://www.telegraph.co.uk/news/obituaries/1328869/Sir-Kenneth-Barraclough.html
 Ronald Bartle, Bow Street Beak (2000)
 https://www.ukwhoswho.com/view/10.1093/ww/9780199540891.001.0001/ww-9780199540884-e-6613

2001 deaths
Knights Bachelor
Stipendiary magistrates (England and Wales)
Commanders of the Order of the British Empire
English justices of the peace
People educated at Oundle School
Alumni of Clare College, Cambridge
Members of the Middle Temple
British Army personnel of World War II
British Army officers